Bruno Miguel Ferreira Rodrigues (born 8 June 2001) is a Portuguese professional footballer who plays as a central defender for Turkish club Fatih Karagümrük on loan from Braga.

Club career
Born in Barreiro, Setúbal District, Rodrigues joined S.C. Braga at the age of 16. He spent his first two seasons as a senior with the reserve side in the third division.

Rodrigues played his first competitive game with the first team on 28 December 2020, coming on as a last-minute substitute in a 4–1 away win against Boavista F.C. in the Primeira Liga. Three days later, he signed a three-and-a-half-year professional contract with the club until 2025.

Rodrigues scored his first goal for Braga on 17 October 2021, the second in the 5–0 away victory over UFC Moitense in the third round of the Taça de Portugal. His first in the UEFA Europa League arrived the following 8 September, when he opened a 2–0 group-stage defeat of Malmö FF.

On 28 January 2023, Rodrigues was loaned to Fatih Karagümrük S.K. of the Turkish Süper Lig with an option to buy.

References

External links

2001 births
Living people
Sportspeople from Barreiro, Portugal
Portuguese footballers
Association football defenders
Primeira Liga players
Campeonato de Portugal (league) players
G.D. Fabril players
S.C. Braga B players
S.C. Braga players
Süper Lig players
Fatih Karagümrük S.K. footballers
Portugal youth international footballers
Portuguese expatriate footballers
Expatriate footballers in Turkey
Portuguese expatriate sportspeople in Turkey